The precise style of British sovereigns has varied over the years.  style is officially proclaimed in two languages:

 in English: 
 in Latin:

Style of the sovereign
The Anglo-Saxon kings of England used numerous different styles, including "King of the Anglo-Saxons" and "King of the English". Grander variations were adopted by some monarchs; for example, Edred used "King of the Anglo-Saxons, Northumbrians, pagans and Britons". These styles were sometimes accompanied by extravagant epithets; for instance, Æthelstan was "King of the English, raised by the right hand of the Almighty to the Throne of the whole Kingdom of Britain".

In Scotland the preferred title of the monarch was "King/Queen of Scots" rather than "of Scotland" (although the latter was by no means unknown).

William I, the first Norman monarch of England, used the simple "King of the English". His successor, William II, was the first consistently to use "by the Grace of God". Henry I added "Duke of the Normans" in 1121, though he had seized Normandy from his brother Robert in 1106. In 1152 Henry II acquired many further French possessions through his marriage to Eleanor of Aquitaine; soon thereafter, he added "Duke of the Aquitanians" and "Count of the Angevins" to his style.

"King of the English", "Duke of the Normans", "Duke of the Aquitanians" and "Count of the Angevins" remained in use until King John ascended the throne in 1199, when they changed to "King of England", "Duke of Normandy", "Duke of Aquitaine" and "Count of Anjou", respectively. John, furthermore, was already the titular ruler of Ireland; therefore, he added "Lord of Ireland" to his style.

In 1204 England lost both Normandy and Anjou. Nevertheless, they did not renounce the associated titles until 1259. French territory once again became the subject of dispute after the death of the French King Charles IV in 1328. Edward III claimed the French throne, arguing that it was to pass to him through his mother Isabella, Charles IV's sister. In France, however, it was asserted that the throne could not pass to or through a woman. Edward III began to use the title "King of France" (dropping "Duke of Aquitaine") after 1337. In 1340 he entered France, where he was publicly proclaimed King. In 1360, however, he agreed to relinquish his title to the French claimant. Though he stopped using the title in legal documents, he did not formally exchange letters confirming the renunciation with the French King. In 1369 Edward III resumed the title, claiming that the French had breached their treaty.

Henry V invaded France, but agreed to the Treaty of Troyes, whereby he was recognised as the Heir and Regent of France, in 1420. He died in 1422, to be succeeded by his infant son, who became Henry VI. Shortly after his accession, Henry VI also inherited the French throne. By the 1450s, however, England had lost all its territories in France, with the exception of Calais. The claim to the title of "King of France" was nonetheless not relinquished until the creation of the United Kingdom of Great Britain and Ireland in 1801, by which time the French monarchy had been overthrown by the French Revolution.

After 1422, the royal style remained unchanged for almost a century. Numerous amendments, however, were effected during Henry VIII's reign. After Henry wrote a book against the Protestant Martin Luther, Pope Leo X rewarded him by granting the title "Defender of the Faith". After disagreements with the Papacy over his marriage to Catherine of Aragon, Henry VIII broke away from the Roman Catholic Church, establishing the Church of England in 1533. Pope Paul III rescinded the grant of the title "Defender of the Faith", but Henry continued to use it. In 1535 Henry added "of the Church of England in Earth, under Jesus Christ, Supreme Head" to his style in 1535; a reference to the Church of Ireland was added in 1536. Meanwhile, advised that many Irish people regarded the pope as the true temporal authority in their nation, with the king of England acting as a mere representative, Henry VIII changed "Lord of Ireland" to "King of Ireland" in 1542. All changes made by Henry VIII were confirmed by an English Act of Parliament passed in 1544.

Mary I, Henry VIII's Catholic daughter, omitted "of the Church of England and also of Ireland in Earth Supreme Head" in 1553, replacing it with "etc.", but the phrase remained part of the official style until an Act of Parliament to the contrary was passed in 1555. In the meantime Mary had married the Spanish prince Philip. The monarchs adopted a joint style, "King and Queen of England and France, Naples, Jerusalem and Ireland, Defenders of the Faith, Princes of Spain and Sicily, Archdukes of Austria, Dukes of Milan, Burgundy and Brabant, Count and Countess of Habsburg, Flanders and Tyrol", acknowledging both Mary's and Philip's titles. Further changes were made after Philip became King of Spain and Sicily upon his father's abdication.

When the Protestant Elizabeth I ascended the throne, she used the simpler "Queen of England, France and Ireland, Defender of the Faith, etc.". The "etc." was added in anticipation of a restoration of the supremacy phrase, which never actually occurred.

After James VI of Scotland, ascended the English throne, the official style changed to "King of England, Scotland, France and Ireland, Defender of the Faith, etc."; his mother Mary, Queen of Scots, had already laid claim to these titles (in a different order, jointly with Francis II of France, then with the King's father, Lord Darnley), but she was beheaded by her Protestant opponent, Elizabeth I. In 1604 James VI made a proclamation permitting the use of "King of Great Britain" instead of "King of England and Scotland". This new style, though commonly used to refer to the King, was never statutory; therefore, it did not appear on legal instruments. It did, however, appear on the inscriptions on coins.

The kingdoms of England and Scotland were formally united into a single Kingdom of Great Britain in 1707 by the Act of Union. Queen Anne consequently assumed the style "Queen of Great Britain, France and Ireland, Defender of the Faith, etc.". It remained in use until 1801, when Great Britain and Ireland combined to become the United Kingdom. George III used the opportunity to drop both the reference to France and "etc." from the style. It was suggested to him that he assume the title "Emperor", but he rejected the proposal. Instead, the style became "King of the United Kingdom of Great Britain and Ireland, Defender of the Faith".

The style used by Victoria in her proclamation to "the Princes, Chiefs and People of India" in 1858 was: "Victoria, by the Grace of God of the United Kingdom of Great Britain and Ireland, and of the Colonies and Dependencies thereof in Europe, Asia, Africa, America, and Australasia, Queen, Defender of the Faith".

In 1876 "Empress of India" was added to Queen Victoria's titles by the Royal Titles Act 1876, so that the Queen of the United Kingdom, the ruler of a vast empire, would not be outranked by her own daughter who had married the heir to the German Empire (an empire by the necessity of establishing a federal monarchy in which several kings wished to retain their royal titles despite their subjugation to a different monarchy). Her successor, Edward VII, changed the style in 1901, by the Royal Titles Act, to reflect the United Kingdom's other colonial possessions, adding "and of the British Dominions beyond the Seas" after "Ireland". In general usage the monarch came to be called the King-Emperor, especially in the Crown's overseas possessions and in British India and the princely states.

In 1922 the Irish Free State gained independence. In 1927 the Royal and Parliamentary Titles Act 1927 changed the description "of the United Kingdom of Great Britain and Ireland and of the British Dominions beyond the Seas" to "of Great Britain, Ireland and the British Dominions beyond the Seas". The 1927 Act was also significant for opening the door to dominions (later Commonwealth realms) having the right to determine their own style and title for the sovereign, a right which was first exercised in 1953.

The designation "Emperor of India" was dropped from the royal style in 1948 after the independence of India and Pakistan a year earlier, even though King George VI remained king of the dominion of India until 1950, when it became a republic within the Commonwealth. The dominion of Pakistan existed between 1947 and 1956, when it too became a republic within the Commonwealth. Similarly, although the republic of Ireland was constituted in 1949, "Great Britain and Ireland" was not replaced with "Great Britain and Northern Ireland" until 1953. In the same year the phrase "Head of the Commonwealth" was also added, and "British Dominions beyond the Seas" was replaced with "other Realms and Territories". Thus, the style of the present sovereign is "By the Grace of God, of the United Kingdom of Great Britain and Northern Ireland and of His other Realms and Territories King, Head of the Commonwealth, Defender of the Faith".

Also in 1953, separate styles were adopted for each of the realms over which the sovereign reigned. Most realms used the form, "Queen of ... and of Her other Realms and Territories, Head of the Commonwealth", omitting the title "Defender of the Faith". Australia, New Zealand and Canada all included a reference to the United Kingdom as well as "Defender of the Faith", but only Canada still uses this form. (Australia dropped both the reference to the United Kingdom and "Defender of the Faith" in 1973; New Zealand dropped the former in 1974.) Canada also publishes an official style in the French language.

List of changes to the royal style 
Official styles of sovereigns are shown below. Heads of state who did not rule as kings or as queens are shown in italics.

English sovereigns

 In 1521 English replaced Latin as the official language of the regnal style.
 ... "and of the Church of England and also of Ireland in Earth Supreme Head" omitted in formal use in early 1554 (omission retroactively approved by an act of Parliament assented to 16 Jan 1555)

Scottish sovereigns

The earliest recorded style of the monarchs of what is now Scotland varies: sometimes it is "King of the Picts", sometimes "King of Fortriu", and sometimes "King of Alba". Only after 900 does the latter title become standard. From the reign of David I, the title became either "rex Scottorum" ("King of Scots") or "rex Scotiae" ("King of Scotland").

The former term was the most common, but the latter was used sometimes. James VI and I proclaimed himself "King of Great Brittaine, France and Ireland” by Royal Proclamation, but this was not accepted by the English Parliament. The last three monarchs of Scotland—William II (William III of England), Mary II and Anne—all used "King/Queen of Scotland" in preference to "of Scots".

English and Scottish sovereigns

British sovereigns

See also
Style of the Canadian sovereign

Notes

References